Sudip Chatterjee can refer to:

 Sudip Chatterjee (cricketer) (born 1991), an Indian cricketer
 Sudip Chatterjee (footballer) (1959–2006), an Indian footballer

See also
 Sudeep Chatterjee, an Indian cinematographer